The Naval Reserve Command (NRC), also known as NAVRESCOM or RESCOM, is one of the Philippine Navy's Major Support Commands created for the sole purpose of reserve force management, procurement, and organization.

Training
Training is one of the primary tasks that is handled by NAVRESCOM. One of its primary training unit is the Naval Reserve Officer Training Corps (NROTC) for tertiary level students, the Basic Citizen's Military Course (BCMC) for civilians who didn't take the NROTC in their tertiary studies, and the Military Orientation Course (MOC) for private or public organizations of utility service providers who signified and volunteered to be part of the Philippine Navy Affiliated Reserve Units (PNARU).

The Naval Reserve Command also through its ROTC Program prepare future officers in the navy serving in the reserve force. Under the Naval Officer Qualification Course (NOQC), college graduates are trained to take roles as officers in Philippine Navy and the Philippine Marine Corps.

Ranks of Navy/Marine Corps personnel

Commissioned officers

Enlisted

Types of reservists
There are currently two (2) types of reservists in the component of the AFP Reserve Force; the Ready Reserve and the Standby Reserve. Ready Reservists are personnel that are always on constant alert and on a call whenever the mobilization order has been given, while Standby Reservists are the personnel that support and augment the Ready Reserve Force when only needed.

Lineage of commanding officers

Mobilization Centers & Units

Mobilization Centers

 Naval Reserve Center - National Capital Region (NRCen-NCR)
 Naval Reserve Center - Northern Luzon (NRCen-NL)
 Naval Reserve Center - Southern Luzon (NRCen-SL)
 Naval Reserve Center - West (NRCen-W)
 Naval Reserve Center - Eastern Visayas (NRCen-EV)
 Naval Reserve Center - Western Visayas (NRCen-WV)
 Naval Reserve Center - Eastern Mindanao (NRCen-EM)
 Naval Reserve Center - Western Mindanao (NRCen-WM)

Naval Reserve Units

 Naval Forces Reserve - NCR (Fort Santiago, Cabildo St, Intramuros, Manila) (NFR-NCR)
Naval Forces Reserve - Northern Luzon (Poro Point, San Fernando, La Union) (NFR-NL)
 Naval Forces Reserve - Southern Luzon (Rawis, Legazpi City) (NFR-SL)
 Naval Forces Reserve - West (Puerto Princesa, Palawan) (NFR-W)
Naval Forces Reserve - Eastern Visayas (Arellano Blvd, Cebu City) (NFR-EV)
Naval Forces Reserve - Western Visayas (Iloilo City) (NFR-WV)
 Naval Forces Reserve - Eastern Mindanao (Naval Station Felix Apolinario, Davao City) (NFR-EM)
Naval Forces Reserve - Western Mindanao (Naval Station Rio Hondo, Brgy Rio Hondo,Zamboanga City) (NFR-WM)

Marine Reserve Units

 Marine Reserve Brigade - NCR (HQS Philippine Marines, Bonifacio Naval Station, Makati)
 Marine Reserve Brigade - West (Puerto Princesa, Palawan)
 Marine Reserve Brigade - Western Visayas (Iloilo City)
 Marine Reserve Brigade - Eastern Visayas (Cebu City)
 Marine Reserve Brigade - Western Mindanao (Zamboanga City)
 Marine Reserve Brigade - Eastern Mindanao (Naval Station Felix Apolinario, Davao City)

Affiliate Reserve Vessels / other units
 TS Kapitan Felix Oca
 4th Naval Construction Battalion (Reserve)
 Naval Affiliated Reserve Force-NCR (WESPHIL)

Awards and decorations

Campaign streamers

Badges

See also
Armed Forces of the Philippines Reserve Command
Philippine Army Reserve Command
Philippine Air Force Reserve Command
Home Defense Command
Philippine Coast Guard Auxiliary
Cadet rank in the Philippines

References
Citations

Bibliography

Philippine Navy Official Website
Naval Reserve Command Official Page
Naval Forces Reserve - National Capital Region Official Facebook Page
Headquarters & Headquarters Support Group - Naval Forces Reserve, National Capital Region Official Facebook Page
22nd Naval Group Reserve, Naval Forces Reserve - National Capital Region Official Facebook Page
21st Naval Group Reserve, Naval Forces Reserve - National Capital Region Official Facebook Page
20th Naval Forces Engineering Battalion, Naval Forces Reserve - National Capital Region Official Facebook Page
Naval Science 21 NROTC Manual, 2001, NAVRESCOM

Commands of the Philippine Navy
Military units and formations established in 1993